The 1917–18 Bucknell Bison men's basketball team represented Bucknell University during the 1917–18 NCAA men's basketball season. The head coach was Malcolm Musser, coaching the Bison in his first season.The Bison's team captain was Albert Elliott.

Schedule

|-

References

Bucknell Bison men's basketball seasons
Bucknell
Bucknell
Bucknell